Cebu Air, Inc., operating as Cebu Pacific, is a low-cost airline based in Pasay, Philippines. Founded in 1988, it is Asia's oldest low-cost airline. It offers scheduled flights to both domestic and international destinations. The airline operates flights from two primary hubs in Cebu and Manila, five secondary hubs in Cagayan de Oro, Clark, Davao, Iloilo, and Kalibo, and a focus city in Zamboanga.

With its low-cost business model, Cebu Pacific became the Philippines' largest airline based on number of passengers flown on domestic and international routes in 2010, overtaking rival Philippine Airlines (PAL). In 2022, the airline had a market share of 57 percent in the domestic market.

History

Foundation and growth (1988–2006) 

The airline was established on August 26, 1988. Republic Act No. 7151, which grants a legislative franchise to Cebu Air, Inc. to operate was approved on August 30, 1991. It started operations on March 8, 1996, with its first flight from Manila to Cebu. Domestic services commenced following market deregulation by the Philippine government. The airline was subsequently acquired by JG Summit Holdings, which was at the time, owned by John Gokongwei. It temporarily ceased operations in February 1998 after being grounded by the government due to an accident that killed 104 people but resumed services later the next month following re-certification of its aircraft. It initially started with 24 domestic flights daily among Metro Manila, Metro Cebu, and Metro Davao. By the end of 2001, its operations had grown to about 80 daily flights to 18 domestic destinations.

In the 2000s, Cebu Pacific was granted rights to operate international flights to the region, including Malaysia, Indonesia, Singapore, Thailand, South Korea, Hong Kong, and Guam. International flights were launched on November 22, 2001, with a twice-daily service to Hong Kong. On March 1, 2002, it commenced thrice-weekly flights to Seoul. Other regional flights were introduced and suspended later; however, including flights to Singapore (from November 6, 2002, to January 2003) and from Manila via Subic to Seoul (from December 2002) due in part to the effects of the SARS epidemic.

In November 2005, Cebu Pacific launched its "Go Fares" promo, reducing its air fares by half to increase the airline's revenue by twenty percent. Following this, the airline gained a significant increase in passengers. Cebu Pacific President Lance Gokongwei said that the low fares aim to attract more people to travel by air.

The airline resumed its Manila–Singapore flights on August 31, 2006 and launched its direct flight from Cebu to Singapore on October 23, 2006, the first low-cost airline to serve the Cebu-Singapore-Cebu sector, and in direct competition with Singapore Airlines' subsidiary SilkAir, CEB was the only Philippine carrier serving the Cebu-Singapore-Cebu route for years until Philippine Airlines resumed its direct service in 2017. The airline operates direct flights from Cebu to Hong Kong which commenced October 2, 2006, which also made CEB the only Philippine carrier to serve a Cebu-Hong Kong-Cebu route after PAL terminated its direct service and is now code-sharing with Cathay Pacific for this route.

Cebu Pacific's plans to begin international flights from Clark in 2007 were initially unsuccessful when its request was denied. The nations involved came to an agreement that Cebu Pacific would be only allowed to operate charter flights from Clark to the respective countries' airport(s). Only Singapore initially agreed to allow Cebu Pacific to fly scheduled flights from Clark to Singapore. It later expanded its routes from Clark to Cebu, Davao, Hong Kong, Macau, and Tokyo.

Expansion and re-branding (2007–2020) 

In November 2007, Cebu Pacific opened a hub at Francisco Bangoy International Airport in Davao City, its fourth hub after Manila, Cebu, and Clark. It later launched direct services from Davao to Singapore, Hong Kong, and Iloilo in May 2008. In late 2007, Cebu Pacific announced plans to launch non-stop flights to the United States West Coast, Houston, Texas and Chicago, Illinois by mid-2009.

On May 28, 2008, Cebu Pacific was named as the world's number one airline in terms of growth. The airline was also ranked fifth in Asia for Budget Airline passengers transported and 23rd in the world. The airline carried a total of almost 5.5 million passengers in 2007, an increase of 57.4 percent from 2006.

In August 2009, Cebu Pacific became the first airline in the Philippines to use social media. The airline created a fan page on Facebook and Twitter.

In October 2010, the airline completed an initial public offering of 30.4% of outstanding shares. It raised  prior to an exercise of an overallotment option and was the largest IPO made by a low-cost carrier.

In January 2011, Cebu Pacific flew its 50 millionth passenger.

In 2012, Cebu Pacific opened its fifth hub at Iloilo International Airport and launched direct flights from Iloilo to Hong Kong, General Santos, Singapore, and Puerto Princesa. Later that year, it opened a hub in Kalibo and launching direct flights from Kalibo to Davao and Puerto Princesa. That same year, Cebu Pacific planned to commence international long-haul flights to the Middle East, the United States, Australia, and some parts of Europe using the Airbus A330-300. The first long-haul flight commenced to Dubai, United Arab Emirates on October 7, 2013. Cebu Pacific is also applying for rights for a daily service to Auckland, New Zealand.

The airline flew its 100 millionth passenger in January 2015. In June of that year, Cebu Pacific revealed its new logo that represents the colors of the Philippines and also symbolizes as an evolution of a low-cost pioneer. The airline received its first Airbus A320 painted in the new livery on January 22, 2016.

Cebu Pacific opened its seventh hub at Cagayan de Oro's Laguindingan Airport in October 2017 and launched direct flights to Dumaguete and Caticlan from Cagayan de Oro. That same month, it flew its 150 millionth passenger. In 2018, Cebu Pacific launched flights to Basco, Batanes and Melbourne, Australia.

COVID-19 pandemic (2020–2022) 
The COVID-19 pandemic impacted the operations of the airline and its regional subsidiary. All operations were suspended during the enhanced community quarantine in Luzon in 2020. Due to low passenger demand, the airline laid off 1,300 employees that year, and sent many aircraft to indefinite storage.

As travel demand recovers, it started rehiring retrenched employees in November 2021 and aims to restore its full workforce by 2023. In March 2022, the airline flew its 200 millionth passenger. By July 2022, the airline operated at 88% of pre-pandemic levels, with domestic operations being restored to 100% of pre-pandemic levels.

Post-pandemic recovery (2023–present)
At the start of 2023, Cebu Pacific fully restored its pre-pandemic capacity and most of its international destinations. It carried 14.8 million passengers in 2022, a huge increase from 2021. As China, being an important market for tourism in the Philippines, lifted travel restrictions, Cebu Pacific increased its frequency of its Manila–Hong Kong flights and resumed some flights to the mainland.

In conjunction with the resumption of some of its flights, Cebu Pacific gradually resumed some flights from its Clark, Cebu, and Iloilo hubs.

Corporate affairs 

Cebu Pacific is headquartered at the Cebu Pacific Building along Domestic Road in Pasay City. The airline is a subsidiary of JG Summit Holdings.

Partnerships
Cebu Pacific was the only Philippines-based member airline of Northwest Airlines' WorldPerks award travel program. WorldPerks offered regular travellers the ability to obtain free tickets, first-class upgrades on flights and other types of rewards. On August 1, 2006, Northwest and Cebu Pacific ended their mileage-accrual agreement.

On May 16, 2016, Cebu Pacific became a founding member of the world's largest low-cost carrier alliance, Value Alliance. It joined other pioneer members Singapore's Scoot, South Korea's Jeju Air, Thailand's Nok Air and NokScoot, Tigerair, Tigerair Australia, and Japan's Vanilla Air in the low-cost carrier network. Cebu Pacific is also currently the only Philippine carrier which is a member of an airline alliance.

Subsidiaries 
Cebgo is the airline's regional subsidiary. It operates an all-turboprop fleet of ATR 72-600 aircraft and is used in regional domestic routes. It was founded in May 2015 following the acquisition of Tigerair Philippines by Cebu Pacific.

Cebu Pacific Cargo operates two dedicated cargo turboprop aircraft. The airline announced in 2018 that it would enter the dedicated cargo market to support the increase in demand for logistics.

Business highlights

Destinations 

Cebu Pacific currently flies to 36 domestic destinations and 26 international destinations in 16 countries across the Asia Pacific region. The airline has the most extensive domestic route network in the Philippines.

Fleet

Current fleet 
, Cebu Pacific operates an all-Airbus fleet composed of the following aircraft:

The airline previously operated a combined fleet of jet and turboprop aircraft. In 2007, Cebu Pacific ordered six ATR 72-500 turboprop aircraft for its regional domestic flights. The ATR aircraft were transferred to its regional subsidiary Cebgo in 2015. In the same year, Cebu Pacific ceased turboprop operations, while Cebgo ceased jet operations with the return of its last Airbus A320 to its parent company.

As part of the airline's modernization, Cebu Pacific is replacing its existing aircraft with new fuel-efficient aircraft by 2028. In addition, as part of the airline's environment initiatives, Cebu Pacific used sustainable aviation fuel (SAF) on its delivery flights, and tested SAF on a commercial passenger flight from Singapore to Manila on September 28, 2022.

Fleet development

Airbus A320 
In 2004, Cebu Pacific signed a purchase agreement with Airbus for the lease of two A320s and the acquisition of twelve A319s to replace its existing fleet of Boeing 757 and McDonnell Douglas DC-9 aircraft. It later ordered seven additional A320s. The A320s supported the airline's expanding international and domestic operations.

Cebu Pacific received its first A320 in 2005, while the airline received its first A320neo in 2019. On June 18, 2019, Cebu Pacific announced an order for an additional five A320neos to replace the older Airbus A320-200.

The A320 fleet currently flies to domestic and international regional destinations in Southeast Asia and East Asia.

Airbus A321 

In June 2011, Cebu Pacific signed a memorandum of understanding for 30 Airbus A321neos including nine leased that will help the airline's growth and development. The deal was finalized in August 2011, with deliveries commencing in 2017. However, due to problems with the Pratt & Whitney engines, the deliveries were delayed. Instead, in June of that year, the airline ordered seven A321ceos to meet ongoing strong growth on its domestic and regional network.

The first 230-seater A321ceo was delivered on March 22, 2018. On January 20, 2019, the airline received its first 236-seater A321neo, registered as RP-C4118 and powered with Pratt & Whitney engines. Like the A320, the A321 currently flies to domestic and international destinations.

On June 18, 2019, Cebu Pacific ordered 10 A321XLRs. The airline is one of the few launch carriers of the newly launched long-range narrow-body aircraft.

Airbus A330 

In 2007, the airline ordered six A330-300s to operate Middle Eastern destinations such as Dubai; East Asia routes such as Beijing, Hong Kong, Seoul, Shanghai, Taipei, and Tokyo, and Southeast Asia routes such as Bangkok, Hanoi, Ho Chi Minh City, Jakarta, Kuala Lumpur, and Singapore. It will also be used in the domestic sector, namely flights to Cebu, Davao, and General Santos. Cebu Pacific received its first A330-300 on June 15, 2013. In 2016, the carrier then added two more A330s on its orders to complement earlier fleet in new long-haul routes, such as Sydney and Melbourne.

On June 18, 2019, Cebu Pacific ordered 16 Airbus A330neos to replace the Airbus A330ceos. The deal was finalized in November 2019. On November 28, 2021, Cebu Pacific received its first 459-seater A330-900.

Former fleet

Criticism and controversies

Customer service and punctuality
Cebu Pacific has been criticized for its poor passenger service, alleged overbooking, flight delays and cancellations. For instance, the airline was also criticized for lack of coordination in the aftermath of the runway excursion incident at Francisco Bangoy International Airport in 2013 and the numerous flight cancellations and delays during the December 2014 Christmas peak season.

In January 2018, Cebu Pacific was named as one of the world's least punctual airlines, with an on-time performance of 57.6 percent in 2017 based on data from OAG. Also included in the list from the Philippines is another low-cost airline, Philippines AirAsia, with an on-time performance of 58.0 percent.

Other controversies
In October 2010, a video uploaded to YouTube showing female flight attendants dancing to Lady Gaga's Just Dance and Katy Perry's California Gurls drew international attention. Despite its popularity, it was criticized by the Flight Attendants and Stewards Association of the Philippines (FASAP), referring it as "sexist and gender-insensitive". That same month, the airline was criticized again for its dancing male crew.

Accidents and incidents
On February 2, 1998, Cebu Pacific Flight 387, a McDonnell Douglas DC-9-30 flying from Manila to Cagayan de Oro, crashed on the slopes of Mount Sumagaya in Misamis Oriental, killing all 104 people on board during its approach to Lumbia Airport.
On July 28, 2010, Cebu Pacific Flight 509, an ATR 72-500, bounced while landing at Manila after a flight from Tuguegarao Airport. The pilots performed a go-around and discovered that they could not retract the landing gear. The plane made a priority landing on runway 13. The aircraft (RP-C7254) was declared a hull loss.
On June 2, 2013, Cebu Pacific Flight 971, an Airbus A320-200 registered as RP-C3266 and carrying 165 passengers inbound from Manila, ran off the runway at Francisco Bangoy International Airport and investigators have found the cause was likely human error. There were no fatalities, however, the plane was heavily damaged. In 2014, the plane returned to service after six months of repairs and maintenance checks.
On August 4, 2017, Cebu Pacific Flight 570, an Airbus A330-300 registered as RP-C3341, due to a nosegear fault, went off the runway stopping on soft ground while taxiing for departure at Mactan–Cebu International Airport. There were no injuries, however, the aircraft incurred minor damage. The runway was closed until the aircraft was moved back on to a paved surface. It was rated as an Incident by CAAP and is under investigation.
On October 13, 2017, Cebu Pacific Flight 461, an Airbus A320-200 registered as RP-C3237, veered to the side of the runway at Iloilo International Airport. No injuries were reported.
On January 16, 2018, Cebu Pacific Flight 970, an Airbus A330-300 bound for Manila, was delayed by almost three hours over a bomb joke by one of the passengers on board at Francisco Bangoy International Airport.
On April 23, 2018, Cebu Pacific Flight 849, an Airbus A320-200 registered as RP-C4105, flew from Manila to Zamboanga with 172 people on board, safely landed on Zamboanga's runway and was about to turn around at the turning pad at the end of the runway when the flight crew stopped the maneuver due to a nose gear steering fault. The entire airport was closed for about three hours until the aircraft could be moved to the apron.
On January 29, 2023, Cebu Pacific Flight 978, an Airbus A321neo bound for Manila from Davao, was delayed by three hours due to another bomb joke in Davao. The alleged passenger who made the joke was arrested, and the plane was moved to an isolation area where all baggage of the 221 passengers on board were rescanned. The plane was scheduled to depart for Manila at six in the evening, but was only allowed to take off at past nine in the evening later that day.

See also 
 List of airlines of the Philippines
 List of airports in the Philippines
 List of companies of the Philippines
 List of low-cost airlines
 Transportation in the Philippines

References

External links 

Official website
Official holidays website
Cebu Pacific

 
Airlines of the Philippines
Airlines established in 1988
Airlines formerly banned in the European Union
Philippine brands
Low-cost carriers
Companies based in Pasay
Companies listed on the Philippine Stock Exchange
Value Alliance
Philippine companies established in 1988